Billy Paul Bookout (June 1, 1932 – October 10, 2008) was an American football player and coach. After a stellar high school and college career, Bookout spent two seasons with the Green Bay Packers before starting a coaching career at the high school level.

Despite an outstanding career at Wichita Falls, Bookout did not drew the attention of college scouts. Blessed with uncommon competitiveness and determination, the   Bookout hitchhiked to Norman, Oklahoma, and tried to make the Sooners team as a walk-on. In the first practice, he hit All-American halfback Billy Vessels in the sternum and caused him to fumble. Soon after, he was awarded a scholarship by Sooners coach Bud Wilkinson.

After his sophomore season, Bookout transferred to Austin College, where he received Little All American honors and served as co-captain. Although he went undrafted in the 1955 NFL Draft, Bookout made the roster of the Green Bay Packers, beating out former All-Pro cornerback Clarence Self. During the 1955 NFL season, Bookout registered 2 interceptions and 3 caused fumbles. He left the NFL after the 1956 season.

Pursuing a coaching career, Bookout got his first job as junior varsity coach at Austin High School of El Paso, Texas. After the season, he was hired as head coach at newly founded El Paso Burges. At age 25, Bookout was at the time the youngest head coach in the state's highest classification. His lack of experience, however, caused the program to struggle. Bookout had to leave Burges two seasons later, and finally became an assistant coach at Bell HS in the Fort Worth suburb of Hurst. In 1968, he was again hired to initiate a football program at a newly founded high school, at Euless Trinity. Bookout served the school for eight years before retiring as head coach.

References

Further reading

1932 births
2008 deaths
People from Shelby County, Texas
American football defensive backs
Oklahoma Sooners football players
Green Bay Packers players
High school football coaches in Texas
Austin Kangaroos football players